The Flight into Egypt is a 1647–1650 oil on canvas painting by Bartolomé Esteban Murillo, which since 1948 has been in the Detroit Institute of Arts. It shows the flight into Egypt, a popular motif in Christian art from the 14th century onwards. It first appears in the written record whilst in the collection of Sir William Chapman in London, passing through other British collections until its sale at Christie's in London in 1945. It was bought by Maurice Harris, who took it to New York and donated it to its present home later that decade.

Diego Angulo's Catálogo crítico lists at least two other treatments of that subject, namely the c.1660 one in the Museum of Fine Arts in Budapest and a 1645-1650 very similar but slightly larger version of the Detroit work now in the Palazzo Bianco in Genoa. The Budapest version adds two small angels hovering over the scene, whilst the main figures of Joseph, Mary and the Christ Child travel in the opposite direction to the Detroit work, while the Genoa version seems to have been painted for La Merced Calzada church in Seville, where it remained until being looted in 1810 by Marshal Soult.

See also
Rest on the Flight into Egypt (Murillo)

References

1640s paintings
Paintings by Bartolomé Esteban Murillo
Murillo
Paintings in the collection of the Detroit Institute of Arts